The 2008 United States presidential election in Arkansas took place on November 4, 2008, and was part of the 2008 United States presidential election. State voters chose six representatives, or electors to the Electoral College, who voted for president and vice president.

Arkansas was won by Republican John McCain by a 19.9% margin of victory, an even greater margin than George W. Bush attained in 2004, despite the national Democratic trend. This was likely due to the issue of race in the presidential election. Prior to the election, all 17 news organizations considered this a state McCain would win, or otherwise a red state. The state trended dramatically Republican in 2008, as McCain performed over 4% better than Bush did in 2004 and more than doubled his margin of victory. Only five counties swung more Democratic in 2008, and the vast majority of counties swung heavily Republican, some by as much as 30%. Of the ten counties with the largest percentage swing to the Republicans in the U.S. during this election, six of them were located in Arkansas.

Obama became the first Democrat to win the White House without carrying Arkansas. Since 1996, the Natural State has rapidly transformed from a Democratic stronghold into one of the most Republican states in the nation. It was also one of the six states where neither Obama nor McCain won during the primary season, and the strongest of five states that swung rightward in this election, the others being Oklahoma, Louisiana, Tennessee, and West Virginia. Even As  Democratic Senator Mark Pryor Cruised to re-election on the same ballot , This was the first time Arkansas did not vote for the winner of the presidential election since 1968. As of 2020, this is the last time Arkansas has voted to the left of Alabama. This was also the first time ever that Arkansas voted to the right of Nebraska.

Primaries
 2008 Arkansas Democratic presidential primary
 2008 Arkansas Republican presidential primary

Campaign

Predictions
There were 16 news organizations who made state-by-state predictions of the election. Here are their last predictions before election day:

Polling

John McCain won every single opinion poll taken in Arkansas prior to the election, with leads ranging from 7% to 29%. Although, McCain polled just in the low 50% range. RealClearPolitics gave the state an average of 52.3% for McCain, compared to 38.8% for Obama. The margin of victory on election day was more than double of the RCP average. The state was not seriously contested by either campaign.

Fundraising
Obama raised $1,004,783. McCain raised $934,884. Both candidates raised the most in Pulaski County.

Advertising and visits
Obama spent over $110,350. McCain spent only $459. Neither candidate visited the state.

Analysis
Although former President Bill Clinton, a Democrat, easily carried his home state of Arkansas in 1992 and 1996, the state was largely considered a safe state for McCain. Early polls gave McCain a 9-point lead among possible voters on Election Day.  Although the state was still strongly Democratic at the state and local levels, on Election Day, Arkansas voted for McCain by a margin of approximately 20%--ten points better than Bush's showing four years earlier.

A handful of counties — some of which had not voted for the Republican presidential candidate since Richard Nixon won every county in 1972 — swung safely into the GOP column. The Delta county of Jackson, for example, swung from a 14.3-point victory for Democrat Kerry in 2004 to a 16.3-point victory for McCain in 2008. A possible factor for such the large swing away from the Democrats could have been the fact that Hillary Clinton, who once served as First Lady of Arkansas while her husband was Governor, did not receive the Democratic presidential nomination in 2008. The polls showed Clinton defeating McCain in Arkansas. Obama became the first Democrat in history to win the White House without carrying Arkansas.

During the same election, however, freshman Democratic U.S. Senator Mark Pryor faced no Republican opposition, and was reelected in a landslide victory over Rebekah Kennedy of the Green Party. The four members of the state's delegation to the U.S. House of Representatives (three Democrats and one Republican) were also reelected with no major-party opposition. Republicans, however, picked up three seats in the Arkansas House of Representatives and one Democratic state representative became a Green (he later returned to the Democratic Party in 2009).

Results

By county

Counties that flipped from Democratic to Republican
 Bradley (largest city: Warren)
 Clay (largest city: Piggott)
 Hempstead (largest city: Hope)
 Jackson (largest city: Newport)
 Clark (largest city: Arkadelphia)
 Lawrence (largest city: Walnut Ridge)
 Lincoln (largest city: Star City)
 Little River (largest city: Ashdown)
 Mississippi (largest city: Osceola)
 Monroe (largest city: Clarendon)
 Poinsett (largest city: Harrisburg)
 Randolph (largest city: Pocahontas)

By congressional district
McCain swept every congressional district in Arkansas, three of which were held by Democrats.

Electors

Technically the voters of Arkansas cast their ballots for electors: representatives to the Electoral College. Arkansas is allocated 6 electors because it has 4 congressional districts and 2 senators. All candidates who appear on the ballot or qualify to receive write-in votes must submit a list of 6 electors, who pledge to vote for their candidate and his or her running mate. Whoever wins the majority of votes in the state is awarded all 6 electoral votes. Their chosen electors then vote for president and vice president. Although electors are pledged to their candidate and running mate, they are not obligated to vote for them. An elector who votes for someone other than his or her candidate is known as a faithless elector.

The electors of each state and the District of Columbia met on December 15, 2008, to cast their votes for president and vice president. The Electoral College itself never meets as one body. Instead the electors from each state and the District of Columbia met in their respective capitols.

The following were the members of the Electoral College from the state. All 6 were pledged to John McCain and Sarah Palin:
Jim Burnett
Reta Hamilton
Rose Bryant Jones
Phyllis Kincannon
Steve Lux
Kermit Parks

See also
 United States presidential elections in Arkansas
 Presidency of Barack Obama

References

Arkansas
2008 Arkansas elections
2008